Jonathan Lambert (born 24 June 1973) is a French actor and comedian.

Filmography

References

External links

 

1973 births
French male film actors
French male television actors
Living people
Male actors from Paris
21st-century French male actors
French humorists
French stand-up comedians